Boronia squamipetala is a species of plant in the citrus family, Rutaceae, and is endemic to Queensland, Australia. It is an erect shrub with pinnate leaves with between five and thirteen elliptic leaflets, and green to white, four-petalled flowers with hairy backs.

Description
fruit develops and have hairy backs. The eight stamens alternate in length with those nearer the sepals longer than those near the petals.

Taxonomy and naming
Boronia squamipetala was first formally described in 1999 by Marco F. Duretto and the description was published in the journal Austrobaileya. The specific epithet (squamipetala) refers to "the scaly appearance of the petals when viewed at low magnification".

Distribution and habitat
This boronia grows in woodland, forest and heath on the Cape York Peninsula, mainly on the Iron and McIlwraith Ranges.

Conservation status
Boronia squamipetala is classed as "least concern" under the Queensland Government Nature Conservation Act 1992.

References 

squamipetala
Flora of Queensland
Plants described in 1999
Taxa named by Marco Duretto